Brajesh Chandra Mishra (29 September 1928 – 28 September 2012) was an Indian diplomat from the Indian Foreign Service and politician, best known for serving as Prime Minister Atal Bihari Vajpayee's principal secretary and National Security Advisor from 1998 to 2004. He received Padma Vibhushan for his contribution

Early life and family 

He was born in Hindu Brahmin family on 29 September 1928 to Dwarka Prasad Mishra, who was a former Chief Minister of Madhya Pradesh. His father was considered a staunch politician from the Congress Party and very close to Indira Gandhi though they fell out later.

Diplomatic career 
Brajesh Mishra joined the Indian Foreign Service in 1951. He served as chargé d'affaires in Beijing after the 1962 Sino-Indian War and was India's ambassador to Indonesia. He was also ambassador and India's Permanent Representative in Geneva. Mishra's last posting was as India's permanent representative to the United Nations from June 1979 to April 1981.

As permanent representative, he voiced India's position on the Soviet invasion of Afghanistan at the sixth emergency special session of the United Nations General Assembly, but his disagreement with that position was part of the reason why he resigned from IFS and joined the United Nations in 1981; serving as 6th United Nations Commissioner for Namibia from 1 April 1982 to 1 July 1987.

Principal secretary and National Security Advisor 
In April 1991, Mishra joined the Bharatiya Janata Party and became head of its foreign policy cell. He resigned from the party in March 1998 on becoming the 9th Principal Secretary to the Prime Minister of India.  After Brajesh Mishra, the post of principal secretary became such a powerful one that it eclipsed the status of cabinet ministers. As Vajpayee's troubleshooter, he was one of the most powerful principal secretaries the PMO had ever seen.

From November 1998 to 23 May 2004, he was also the first National Security Advisor and was instrumental in creating an institutional structure for national security management. His batch as an Indian Foreign Service officer was the same as the Indian Administrative Service batch of K. Subrahmanyam, widely considered as the doyen of India's strategic affairs community, and made him the first convener of the National Security Advisory Board where they worked closely on many issues.

He was the key motivator of foreign policy and principal spokesman on all major issues. And the opportunities for him were endless. From Pokhran-2 to Kashmir, and from Vajpayee's historic visit to Pakistan to engaging the United States in a strategic dialogue, he was behind a never-ending series of foreign policy and security maneuver.

He is stated to have played a major role in pushing and supporting the Bhutan to undertake Operation All Clear.

Final years and death 
After demitting office, Mishra had initially expressed reservations against the Indo-US civilian nuclear deal. Following this, the then prime minister, Manmohan Singh briefed specially to address his concerns about the deal. However, support to nuclear deal was Mishra's last tribute to Vajpayee. Thereafter, Mishra extended his support and publicly endorsed the deal. This position of his was at variance with the Bharatiya Janata Party's, the party to which he once belonged to and in whose government he had been the National Security Advisor of the country, which was opposed to the deal.

In 2011, he was awarded Padma Vibhushan (the second highest civilian award).

Mishra died on 28 September 2012 at Fortis hospital, Vasant Kunj in New Delhi.

References

External links 

 Articles at Outlook India on Brajesh Mishra
 Brajesh Mishra's Interview with Rediff.com
 Brajesh Mishra (1928–2012) – An Assessment by B Raman, Additional Secretary (retd), Cabinet Secretariat, Govt. of India
 Man who was ‘Bharat sarkar’ – Gopalkrishna Gandhi
 Brajesh Mishra: India's First Intelligence Tsar

Vajpayee administration
2012 deaths
Recipients of the Padma Vibhushan in civil service
1928 births
Permanent Representatives of India to the United Nations
Indian Foreign Service officers
Madhya Pradesh politicians
Bharatiya Janata Party politicians from Madhya Pradesh
Principal Secretary to the Prime Minister of India